Mahmoud Sehili (27 July 1931 – 10 October 2015) was a Tunisian painter.

Biography
Sehili was born in Tunis; his father was a fisherman and his mother an embroiderer. He developed a passion for music and learned the oud. After studying at the Tunis Institute of Fine Arts from 1949 to 1952, he completed his training at the École nationale supérieure des Beaux-Arts from 1953 to 1960. His professor was Raymond Legueult.

On his return to Tunisia, he hosted a workshop and provided courses at the School of Fine Arts of Tunis from 1960 to 1980.

References

1931 births
2015 deaths
École des Beaux-Arts alumni
People from Tunis
20th-century Tunisian painters
21st-century Tunisian painters